Blastobasis chanes is a moth in the  family Blastobasidae. It is found in Costa Rica.

The length of the forewings is 4–4.5 mm. The forewings are pale brown intermixed with a few brown scales. The hindwings are translucent pale brown.

Etymology
The specific epithet is derived from Latin chane (meaning a fish).

References

Moths described in 2013
Blastobasis